Ticket to Ride may refer to:

Games
 Ticket to Ride (board game), a rail-themed Eurogame by Alan R. Moon 
 Ticket to Ride (video game), its digital adaptation
 Ticket to Ride: The Card Game, a simplified spin-off

Music
 Ticket to Ride (album), 1969, by the Carpenters
 "Ticket to Ride" (song), 1965, by the Beatles
 "Ticket to Ride", on Stronger (Sara Evans album), 2011

Other uses
 Ticket to Ride (book), a 2003 Beatles-related memoir of Larry Kane
 Ticket to Ride (novel), a 1986 work by Dennis Potter
 Ticket to Ride (T2R), Number Nine Visual Technology's defunct line of computer graphics cards